A fuel filter is a filter used to screens out foreign particles or liquids from the fuel. Most internal combustion engines use a fuel filter, in order to protect the components in the fuel system.

Filters for foreign particles 
Unfiltered fuel may contain several kinds of contamination, for example paint chips and dirt that has entered the fuel tank while filling, or rust caused by moisture in a steel tank. If these substances are not removed before the fuel enters the system, they will cause rapid wear and failure of the fuel pump and injectors.

The filters are normally made into cartridges containing a filter paper. Fuel filters need to be maintained or replaced at regular intervals.

Filters for foreign liquids 
Some diesel engines use a bowl-like design to collect water in the bottom of the filter (as diesel floats on top of water). The water can then be drained off by opening a valve in the bottom of the bowl and letting it run out, until only the fuel remains.

See also

 Fuel pump
 Fuel tank

References

Filters
Engine components